Howard Shelanski (born 1964) is an American attorney, economist, and legal scholar. He is a professor of law at Georgetown University, where he holds the Sheehy Chair in Antitrust Law and Trade Regulation, and a partner in the law firm of Davis, Polk & Wardwell. He served in the Obama administration as administrator of the Office of Information and Regulatory Affairs (OIRA), part of the Office of Management and Budget.

Early life and education

Howard Shelanski was born in Philadelphia. He received his Bachelor of Arts from Haverford College in 1986, his Juris Doctor from the UC Berkeley School of Law in 1992, and his Ph.D. in economics from University of California, Berkeley in 1993.

Career 
After graduating from law school Shelanski clerked for Judge Stephen F. Williams of the U.S. Court of Appeals for the D.C. Circuit, Judge Louis H. Pollak of the U.S. District Court in Philadelphia, and Justice Antonin Scalia of the United States Supreme Court. He practiced law with the Washington, D.C. firm of Kellogg Huber Hansen Todd & Evans until 1997. He joined the Berkeley faculty in 1997, where he remained until moving to Georgetown Law in 2011. Shelanski's teaching and research have focused on antitrust and regulation.

Shelanski was senior economist for the Council of Economic Advisers from 1998 to 1999, chief economist of the Federal Communications Commission from 1999 to 2000, deputy director from 2009 to 2011, and director Federal Trade Commission's Bureau of Economics from 2012 to 2013. President Obama nominated Shelanski to be administrator of the Office of Information and Regulatory Affairs on April 25, 2013, and he was confirmed to the post on June 27, 2013. He left office on January 20, 2017.

See also 
 List of law clerks of the Supreme Court of the United States (Seat 9)

References

1964 births
Administrators of the Office of Information and Regulatory Affairs
21st-century American economists
American lawyers
Date of birth missing (living people)
Federal Trade Commission personnel
Haverford College alumni
Living people
Obama administration personnel
UC Berkeley School of Law faculty
Law clerks of the Supreme Court of the United States
Davis Polk & Wardwell lawyers
Georgetown University Law Center faculty